San Joaquín Airport ,  is an airport  south of San Joaquín, a town in the Beni Department of Bolivia. The airport replaces an older one adjacent to the town.

The San Joaquin non-directional beacon (Ident: JOA) is located in town, near the old airstrip.

See also

Transport in Bolivia
List of airports in Bolivia

References

External links 
OpenStreetMap - San Joaquín Airport
OurAirports - San Joaquín Airport
SkyVector - San Joaquín Airport
Fallingrain - San Joaquín Airport

Airports in Beni Department